Events from the year 1911 in Mexico.

Incumbents

Federal government
President – Porfirio Diaz until May 25, Francisco León de la Barra until November 5, Francisco I. Madero from November 6
Vice President: Ramón Corral, José María Pino Suárez from November 25
Secretary of Foreign Affairs: Enrique C. Creel Cuilty, Victoriano Salado Álvarez, Francisco Leon de la Barra, Bartolomé Carvajal y Rosas, Manuel Calero
Secretary of the Interior: Ramon Corral, Emilio Vázquez Gómez, Alberto García Granados, Abraham González (governor) from November 6

Governors
 Aguascalientes: Alberto Fuentes Dávila
 Campeche: Manuel Castilla Brito
 Chiapas: José Inés Cano/Ramón Rabasa/Manuel Trejo/Manuel Rovelo Argüello/Manuel Rovelo Argüello/Marco Aurelio Solís/Reynaldo Gordillo León
 Chihuahua: Alberto Terrazas Cuilty/Abraham González/Miguel Ahumada/Aureliano L. González
 Coahuila: Venustiano Carranza
 Colima: Miguel García Topete
 Durango:  
 Guanajuato: 
 Hidalgo: 
 Jalisco: David Gutiérrez Allende/Alberto Robles Gil
 State of Mexico: 
 Michoacán: 
 Morelos: Pablo Escandón Barrón/Francisco Leyva Arciniegas/Juan Nepomuceno Carreón/Ambrosio Figueroa
 Nayarit: 
 Nuevo León: Viviano L. Villarreal
 Oaxaca: 
 Puebla: 
 Querétaro: Adolfo de la Isla/Alfonso M. Veraza/José Antonio Septién/Carlos M. Loyola
 San Luis Potosí: José María Espinosa y Cuevas/Rafael Cepeda
 Sinaloa: 
 Sonora: José María Maytorena
 Tabasco: 
 Tamaulipas: 
 Tlaxcala:  
 Veracruz: Teodoro A. Dehesa Méndez/Emilio Léycegui/León Aillaud/Manuel María Alegre
 Yucatán: José María Pino Suárez/Jesús L. González
 Zacatecas:

Events
January 29 – Capture of Mexicali
April – First Battle of Agua Prieta
April 7–May 10 – Battle of Ciudad Juarez (1911)
May 8–9 – First Battle of Tijuana
May 11–19 – Battle of Cuautla (1911)
May 15 – Torreón massacre
June 22 – Second Battle of Tijuana

Births
February 14 – Nabor Carrillo Flores, third son of Mexican composer Julián Carrillo Trujillo (d. 1961)
March 12 – Gustavo Diaz Ordaz, 49th President of Mexico (d. 1979)
March 29 – Mario Pani, architect and urbanist (d. 1993)
July 10 — Amalia Solórzano, First Lady of Mexico (1934-1940) (d. 2008)
August 12 – Cantinflas, comic film actor, producer, and screenwriter (d. 1993)
November 30 – Jorge Negrete, singer, actor (d. 1953)
Date unknown — Josefina Vicens, novelist (d. 1988)

Deaths
 March 24: Pablo Torres Burgos, who along with Emiliano Zapata and Rafael Merino began the Revolution in Morelos on March 11, 1911 (b. 1878

See also
Mexican Revolution

References

 
Mexico
Years of the 20th century in Mexico
Years in Mexico